Bence Sós (born 10 May 1994) is a Hungarian football player who plays for Debreceni VSC.

Career

Debrecen
On 31 May 2015, Sós played his first match for Debrecen in a 5-0 win against Győr in the Hungarian League.

Career statistics

Club

References

External links

1994 births
Living people
Sportspeople from Debrecen
Hungarian footballers
Association football midfielders
Debreceni VSC players
Létavértes SC players
Mezőkövesdi SE footballers
Fehérvár FC players
Puskás Akadémia FC players
Nemzeti Bajnokság I players